Independence Township is the name of some places in the U.S. state of Pennsylvania:

Independence Township, Beaver County, Pennsylvania
Independence Township, Washington County, Pennsylvania

Pennsylvania township disambiguation pages